is a 2000 action RPG video game developed and published by Asmik Ace Entertainment exclusively in Japan on July 14, 2000.

See also 
 Mine Yoshizaki

References

2000 video games
Action video games
Asmik Ace Entertainment games
MillenniumQuest
Game Boy Color games
Game Boy Color-only games
Japan-exclusive video games
Video games developed in Japan
Video games featuring protagonists of selectable gender